The 5th Legislative Assembly of Quebec was the provincial legislature in Quebec, Canada that existed from December 2, 1881, to October 14, 1886. The Quebec Conservative Party led Joseph-Adolphe Chapleau, Joseph-Alfred Mousseau and John Jones Ross was the governing party. Chapleau was succeeded by Mousseau in 1882 while Ross succeeded Mousseau in 1884. It was the Conservatives last majority government.

The sixty-five members were each elected in a single-member district through First past the post.

Seats per political party

 After the 1881 elections

Member list

This was the list of members of the Legislative Assembly of Quebec that were elected in the 1881 election:

Other elected MLAs

Other MLAs were elected in by-elections during the term

 William Joseph Poupore, Quebec Conservative Party, Pontiac, March 6, 1882
 Guillaume-Alphonse Nantel, Quebec Conservative Party, Terrebonne, August 19, 1882
 Joseph-Alfred Mousseau, Quebec Conservative Party, Jacques Cartier, August 26, 1882
 Benjamin Beauchamp, Quebec Conservative Party, Deux-Montagnes, October 21, 1882 
 Pierre-Évariste Leblanc, Quebec Conservative Party, Laval, October 30, 1882  & July 14, 1884  
 François-Xavier Archambault, Quebec Conservative Party, Vaudreuil, October 30, 1882 
 Henri-Josué Martin, Quebec Conservative Party, Bonaventure, October 31, 1882 
 Louis-Tréfflé Dorais, Conservative Independent, Nicolet, February 5, 1883 
 Amédée Gaboury, Quebec Liberal Party, Laval, June 13, 1883 
 François-Xavier Lemieux, Quebec Liberal Party, Lévis, November 16, 1883 
 Joseph-Émery Robidoux, Quebec Liberal Party, Châteauguay, March 26, 1884 
 Arthur Boyer, Quebec Liberal Party, Jacques Cartier, March 26, 1884 
 Henri-René-Arthur Turcotte, Conservative Independent, Trois-Rivières, March 26, 1884 
 Alfred Lapointe, Quebec Conservative Party, Vaudreuil, June 19, 1884 
 John Whyte, Quebec Liberal Party, Mégantic, October 29, 1884 
 Alfred McConville, Quebec Conservative Party, Joliette, September 25, 1885 
 Édouard-Hippolyte Laliberté, Quebec Liberal Party, Lotbinière, January 30, 1886 
 Joseph-Éna Girouard, Quebec Liberal Party, Drummond et Arthabaska, March 24, 1886

Cabinet Ministers

Chapleau Cabinet (1881-1882)

 Prime Minister and Executive Council President: Joseph-Adolphe Chapleau
 Agriculture and public works: John Jones Ross (1881-1882), Elisée Dionne (1882)
 Crown Lands: Edmund James Flynn
 Railroad: John Jones Ross (1881-1882), William Warren Lych (1882)
 Attorney General: Louis-Onésime Loranger
 Secretary and Registry: Etienne-Théodore Pâquet
 Treasurer: Joseph Gibb Robertson (1881-1882), Jonathan Saxton Campbell Wurtele (1882)
 Solicitor General: William Warren Lynch
 Legislative Council President: John Jones Ross

Mousseau Cabinet (1882-1884)

 Prime Minister and Executive Council President: Joseph-Alfred Mousseau
 Agriculture and public works: Elisée Dionne 
 Crown Lands: William Warren Lynch
 Railroad: Henry Starnes
 Attorney General: Joseph-Alfred Mousseau
 Secretary and Registry: Jean Blanchet
 Treasurer: Jonathan Saxton Campbell Wurtele

Ross Cabinet (1884-1886)

 Prime Minister and Executive Council President: John Jones Ross
 Agriculture and public works: John Jones Ross
 Crown Lands: William Warren Lynch
 Railroad: Edmund James Flynn
 Attorney General: Louis-Olivier Taillon
 Secretary and Registry: Jean Blanchet
 Treasurer: Joseph Gibb Robertson
 Solicitor General: Edmund James Flynn (1885-1886)

References
 1881 election results
 List of historical Cabinet Ministers

Notes

005